Shirui Lily Cup, also known as the Shirui Lily National Level Football Knockout Cup, is an Indian football tournament held in Ukhrul and organized by Ukhrul District Sports Association (UDSA). The tournament was first started in 1973 by an engineer and is named after Shirui lily, the state flower of Manipur. Shirui Lily Cup returnined after 10 years of gape. Last tournament held in 2011 was won by AIM.

Ukhrul District Sports Association had announced that the 29th edition of the Shirui Lily Cup football tournament was going to be held from November 22 to December 4, 2021. Shillong Lajong won the 29th edition of the tournament by defeating KLASA 4–3 in tie-breaker.

Results

References 

Football cup competitions in India
1973 establishments in India
Recurring sporting events established in 1973
Ukhrul
Football in Manipur